Evelyne Kraft (22 September 1951 – 13 January 2009) was a Swiss businesswoman and former actress. She was best known for her roles in the films Lady Dracula and The Mighty Peking Man.

Background
Born in Zürich, Switzerland on 22 September 1951, Kraft made her acting debut in 1972 as Evelyne Elgar alongside Anita Ekberg in the Italian horror film Casa d'appuntamento. This was followed by the role of a mechanic, Jacqueline, in Rudolf Zehetgruber's 1973 German comedy film Ein Käfer auf Extratour (1973) and other roles in Die Fabrikanten, The Maddest Car in the World, Crime After School, and The Fifth Commandment. Kraft also acted in the TV series Ein Fall für Männdli episode Die Verrückte. She gained fame for the portrayal of the title heroine in Franz Josef Gottlieb's 1977 West German film Lady Dracula.

She starred in two Hong Kong Shaw Brothers films, Deadly Angels and The Mighty Peking Man, both in 1977. Kraft played her last role in the 1981 Soviet-French-Swiss co-production Teheran 43 as Jill the false secretary, before retiring from acting.

She later married the heir to a real estate company and had three children. In 1995, she presided over her husband's construction timber company, with business and charity interests based in Nigeria. She also dedicated herself to animal welfare and global poverty concerns.

She died due to sudden heart failure with her family by her side in Islisberg on 13 January 2009.

Filmography

Films

Television

References

External links

1951 births
2009 deaths
Swiss film actresses
20th-century Swiss actresses
Swiss television actresses